Vladimír Táborský (born 28 April 1944) is a retired Czech football player. He played for Czechoslovakia, for which he played 19 matches.

In his country he played for Sparta Prague.

External links
Profile at ČMFS

1944 births
Living people
Czech footballers
Czechoslovak footballers
Czechoslovakia international footballers
Dukla Prague footballers
AC Sparta Prague players
Czech football managers
Czechoslovak football managers
Xanthi F.C. managers
AC Sparta Prague managers
FK Viktoria Žižkov managers
Athlitiki Enosi Larissa F.C. managers
FC Zbrojovka Brno managers
Apollon Pontou FC managers
Panserraikos F.C. managers
FC Hradec Králové managers
Veria F.C. managers
Association football defenders
Patraikos F.C. managers
Expatriate football managers in Greece
Czech expatriate sportspeople in Greece
Footballers from Prague